Ruffhouse Records is an American record label founded in 1989 by Chris Schwartz and Joe Nicolo as a joint venture with Columbia Records. In 1999, Schwartz and Nicolo closed the label, and Schwartz and Kevon Glickman continued with RuffNation Records. Ruffhouse's artist roster at the time of its original closing included The Fugees, Cypress Hill, Kris Kross, Wyclef Jean, Lauryn Hill, and Leela James.

The label was relaunched on July 12, 2012, through EMI, with Beanie Sigel as the first artist to be out through its relaunch with the release of his album This Time (2012).

Notable artists 

Beanie Sigel
Cheba
Cypress Hill
Dandelion
DMX
John Forté
Fugees
The Goats
 Glenn Lewis
Lauryn Hill
Pras Michel
Leela James
Wyclef Jean
Keith Martin
King Britt
Kool Keith
Kris Kross
Lin Que
Mountain Brothers
Nas
Pacewon
Psycho Realm
Schoolly D
Sporty Thievz
Armand Van Helden
Josh Wink

References

External links 
 Ruffhouse Records (list of Ruffhouse Records recordings referencing artists above)

American record labels
Record labels established in 1989
Record labels disestablished in 1999
Columbia Records
Ruffhouse Records artists
Ruffhouse Records albums